FS Seoul is a South Korean professional futsal club based in Songpa-gu, Seoul. The club was founded in December 2009.

Honors
 FK-League
 Champions (1) : 2010–11
 Runners-up (1) : 2009–10
 FK Cup
 Champions (2) : 2010, 2011

External links
 Official Website 
 Facebook 
 Daum cafe 

Futsal clubs in Seoul
Futsal clubs established in 2009
2009 establishments in South Korea